KRFS-FM (103.9 FM) is a radio station licensed to Superior, Nebraska, United States. The station airs a country music format and is currently owned by CK Broadcasting, Inc.

References

External links
KRFS-FM's website

RFS
Country radio stations in the United States